Seidel's algorithm is an algorithm designed by Raimund Seidel in 1992 for the all-pairs-shortest-path problem for undirected, unweighted, connected graphs. It solves the problem in  expected time for a graph with  vertices, where  is the exponent in the complexity  of  matrix multiplication. If only the distances between each pair of vertices are sought, the same time bound can be achieved in the worst case. Even though the algorithm is designed for connected graphs, it can be applied individually to each connected component of a graph with the same running time overall. There is an exception to the expected running time given above for computing the paths: if  the expected running time becomes .

Details of the implementation 

The core of the algorithm is a procedure that computes the length of the shortest-paths between any pair of vertices.
This can be done in  time in the worst case.

Computing the shortest-paths lengths 

The Python code below assumes the input graph is given as a  - adjacency matrix  with zeros on the diagonal. The matrix class used can be any matrix class implementation supporting the multiplication, exponentiation, and indexing operators (for example numpy.matrix).

def apd(A, n: int):
    """Compute the shortest-paths lengths."""
    if all(A[i][j] for i in range(n) for j in range(n) if i != j):
        return A
    Z = A ** 2
    B = matrix([
        [1 if i != j and (A[i][j] == 1 or Z[i][j] > 0) else 0 for j in range(n)]
    for i in range(n)])
    T = apd(B, n)
    X = T*A
    degree = [sum(A[i][j] for j in range(n)) for i in range(n)]
    D = matrix([
        [2 * T[i][j] if X[i][j] >= T[i][j] * degree[j] else 2 * T[i][j] - 1 for j in range(n)]
    for i in range(n)])
    return D

The base case tests whether the input adjacency matrix describes a complete graph, in which case all shortest paths have length .

Graphs with weights from finite universes 

Algorithms for undirected and directed graphs with weights from a finite universe  also exist. The best known algorithm for the directed case is in time  by Zwick in 1998. This algorithm uses rectangular matrix multiplication instead of square matrix multiplication. Better upper bounds can be obtained if one uses the best rectangular matrix multiplication algorithm available instead of achieving rectangular multiplication via multiple square matrix multiplications. The best known algorithm for the undirected case is in time  by Shoshan and Zwick in 1999. The original implementation of this algorithm was erroneous and has been corrected by Eirinakis, Williamson, and Subramani in 2016.

Notes 

Graph algorithms
Polynomial-time problems
Computational problems in graph theory
Articles with example Python (programming language) code
Graph distance